Research associates are researchers (scholars and professionals) that usually have an advanced degree beyond a Master's degree.

In some universities/research institutes, such as Harvard/Harvard Medical School/Harvard School of Public Health, the candidate holds the degree of Ph.D. or possess training equivalent to that required for the Ph.D. In addition, the candidate must have demonstrated exceptional fitness in independent research. This position allows the candidate to enlarge professional network, get more experience, get publications, fellowships, grants to establish independence as a PI or start looking for a more secure permanent job. It can advance to Senior Research Associate (higher pay with more responsibilities equivalent to a PI), Research Scientist, Senior Research Scientist, Principal Research Scientist, and later Head of Research or equivalent.

In contrast to a research assistant, a research associate often has a graduate degree, such as a master's (e.g. Master of Science) or in some cases Master of Engineering or a doctoral degree (e.g. Doctor of Philosophy, Doctor of Medicine or Doctor of Pharmacy). In some cases it can be synonymous with postdoctoral research.

See also
Research fellow

References 

Physiology & Biophysics - Postdoctoral Personnel

Academic administration
Associate